Contentment is an emotional state of satisfaction that can be seen as a mental state drawn from being at ease in one's situation, body and mind. Colloquially speaking, contentment could be a state of having accepted one's situation and is a milder and more tentative form of happiness.

Contentment and the pursuit of contentment are a central thread through many philosophical or religious schools across diverse cultures, times and geographies. Siddhartha, the founder of Buddhism, once said "Health is the most precious gain and contentment, the greatest wealth". John Stuart Mill, centuries later, would write "I have learned to seek my happiness by limiting my desires, rather than in attempting to satisfy them." Marcus Aurelius wrote "Live with the gods. And he who does so constantly shows them that his soul is satisfied with what is assigned to them." Hebrews 13:5 reads "Keep your lives free from the love of money and be content with what you have, because God has said, 'Never will I leave you; never will I forsake you.'" Chinese philosopher Zhuang Zhou once wrote in the 3rd century BCE, "A gentleman who profoundly penetrates all things and is in harmony with their transformations will be contented with whatever time may bring. He follows the course of nature in whatever situation he may be."

The literature above all states that contentment is a state which is ideally reached through being happy with what a person has, as opposed to achieving one's larger ambitions. Socrates described this by saying, "He who is not contented with what he has, would not be contented with what he would like to have." There are a number of elements of achievement that make finding a state of personal contentment easier, such as a strong family unit, a strong local community, and satisfaction of life's basic needs as expressed in Maslow's hierarchy of needs. In general, the more needs in Maslow's hierarchy are achieved, the more easily one might achieve contentment.

General

Many religions have some form of eternal bliss or heaven as their goal, often contrasted with eternal torment or dissatisfaction. The source of all dissatisfaction appears to stem from the ability to compare experiences and then infer that one's state is not ideal.

In the Bible, there is an account that man's fall from his paradisal state was caused by man eating the forbidden fruit from the Tree of the Knowledge of Good and Evil. Man's eyes were opened to know the distinction between good and evil (Genesis 3). In other words, when man becomes intellectually developed to distinguish between good and evil, he realizes there is a gap between what he considers good or ideal and what he is experiencing. The perception of this disparity is what creates psychological and physiological tension.

In the Tao Te Ching, this development of man from his primal state of consciousness called Tao is similarly expounded in this manner: "When the Tao is lost, there is goodness. When goodness is lost, there is morality ...".  Morality is the intellectual discernment between good and evil. There is a belief that one can achieve contentment by living "in the moment," which represents a way to stop the judgmental process of discriminating between good and bad. However, attempting to live in the moment is difficult because a person's attention is not only distracted by sensory stimuli but also psychological processes that conspire to make them think subconsciously or consciously. This thinking process is involved with memories; hence, the attempt to stay in the present is a ponderous one given that there is a subconscious struggle to break away from memories, especially unhappy ones. For this reason, specializations in this pursuit to live in the moment are found in various religious and mystical schools, manifested in forms of meditation and prayer. Various studies have shown prayer to promote well-being in religious people.

Practicing contentment as an attitude is another way for a person to obtain it in their lives. Practicing gratitude is another way to understand what contentment as an attitude is about. Seen in this light, contentment is not an achievement but an attitude that one can adopt at any time.

The American philosopher Robert Bruce Raup wrote a book Complacency: The Foundation of Human Behavior (1925) in which he claimed that the human need for complacency (i.e. inner tranquility) was the hidden spring of human behavior. Raup made this the basis of his pedagogical theory, which he later used in his criticisms of the American education system of the 1930s. In the context of present-day society, the multidimensional leisure culture evinces the desire of man to return to his core state of contentment by letting go of his hectic outer activities.

Contentment and positive psychology

In many ways, contentment can be closely associated with the concept of happiness and satisfaction. In positive psychology, social scientists study what might contribute to living a good life, or what would lead to people having increased positive mood and overall satisfaction with their life.

Happiness, in positive psychology, is defined in a twofold manner, which in totality is referred to as subjective well-being. How much positive emotion (positive affect) as opposed to negative emotion (negative affect) a person has, and how one views one's life overall (global satisfaction) are the questions asked in positive psychology to determine happiness. Contentment is closely related to a person's level of satisfaction with his or her life (global satisfaction).

In the 2014 book Lucky Go Happy : Make Happiness Happen!, Paul van der Merwe uses a chart to illustrate how being content for long periods of time, can yield more happiness than being ecstatic during a short period.

Positive psychology finds it very important to study what contributes to people being happy and to people flourishing, and finds it just as important to focus on the constructive ways in which people function and adapt, as opposed to the general field of psychology which focuses more on what goes wrong or is pathological with human beings.

The role of positive psychology can have a great impact on the many aspects of one's life. Human beings have a great ability to adapt, we can adapt to both the good and the bad that may happen in life. Usually in life, circumstances do not hold a long lasting effect on one's mood.

Variables that contribute to happiness in research

Satisficer vs. maximizer
These are two concepts that define the ways in which people make choices. A satisficer is a person who will make a decision once his/her criteria are met, and a maximizer, on the other hand, won't make a decision until every possible option is explored.

Genes
There is evidence suggesting that there is a relationship between contentment and genes. In a study done by Weiss et al. (2008) they found that genetics can be a factor in a person’s overall well-being. More specifically, genes seem to be within the layer of factors that contribute to well-being and happiness. The study suggested that genes have a positive relationship between personality traits and happiness traits, similar to the relationship of comorbidity in psychopathy.

In a more recent study by Matsunaga et al. (2018), certain gene receptors have been found to play a role in the perception of one’s happiness as they directly impact emotional processing and other physiological processes such as appetite regulation, evaluation of self and others, and memory.

Personality
Through factor analysis, personality can be narrowed down according to the five factor model, which holds that there are five aspects of heritable personality traits: openness to experience, conscientiousness, extraversion, agreeableness, and neuroticism. Research has shown that personality is 50% heritable, but not always. One's level or perception of happiness, or one's subjective well-being, has shown to be related to personality traits. There are two aspects of personality which are related to happiness. There is a strong relationship between extraversion and happiness, in that the more extraverted a person is (or behaves) the more happy he/she will likely be.  The other aspect of personality which has a strong relationship to happiness is the genetic predisposition to neuroticism. The more neurotic (emotionally unstable) a person is, the more likely he/she is to be unhappy.

In a study concerning the development of the positive emotion assessment, also known as PEACE, on contentment it was found that higher levels of contentment were correlated with low levels of need for materialism and greed.

Goal pursuits
Reaching goals that are important to oneself and that are in alignment with one's personality can contribute to feelings of confidence and mastery. It is important to establish goals that are neither too easy or too hard, but that are optimally challenging. It is also important to note that investing energy in avoiding goals will contribute to diminishing happiness as well as deter one from reaching one's goals, which can be quite intuitive to understand.

Money
Many people strongly associate money with happiness, and they believe that being rich will contribute greatly to making them happier, and the American society reflects this growing materialism. Although wealth is associated with some positive outcomes, i.e. lighter prison sentences for the same crime, better health, and lower infant mortality, and can act as a buffer in certain instances, as mentioned previously, the overall relationship between money and happiness is marginal.

However, beyond a low threshold where the basic needs are met, money has a very small impact on happiness.  There is also the concept of the diminishing marginal utility of income (DMUI), which is that money has no effect on happiness once a certain income level has been reached, and which represents wealth and happiness as having a curvilinear relationship.

Indeed, when one has met his basic needs and have more to spare, it is time to spend or give some to experience happiness.  This is because happiness is really a state of in-and-out flow of one's energy. Using or giving money is an expression of out-flowing of one's life-state. Attempt to just hoard more and more in the belief that it brings more happiness can lead to the opposite result if only because the means – that is the pursuit of money for happiness – has unwittingly become the ends.

Leisure (also Leisure satisfaction)
The concept of work-life balance is now well-accepted. The 'life' aspect of this 'work-life' concept includes activities devoted to one's personal life which sometimes calls for the kind of commitment and effort no less than that demanded from one's work-life.

In some societies, this 'life' aspect might include looking after the elderly and infirm, sending children to and from schools, preparing the meals, cleaning the house and doing the laundry. They are as much work as the work life, and in the midst of all these, the need for leisure activities is simply an alien concept.

Leisure as a culture is not a universal societal value although the younger generation in developed or near-developed societies seems more inclined toward it.  Overseas trips, lounging in a cafe with friends, attending concerts, relaxing in a spa, karaoke-ing and similar activities after office hours are now prevalent among that generation.  In fact, over the last 15 years, the market has seen a tremendous surge in demand for such leisure services.  In his book "In the Era of Human Capital", Richard Crawford charted the exponential growth of the Business & Leisure sector in the post-industrial society.
This trend might look like an offshoot of a more affluent society; however, the need for leisure is intrinsic in humans and only through the demands of modern economic life – run as it were by the clock, timetables, deadlines and schedules – did this need fade into the background.

Humans' need for leisure is intrinsic because that is the state they were born with, or rather, that is the state of life in the natural world.  Leisure implies that one is not pressured by others or oneself to deliver a certain result but that life is lived to enjoy the simple pleasures of exploring the world that one is born into.

This happy state of life is that generally experienced by the pre-school child and is gradually lost when duties and responsibilities of school life and subsequently the adult work-life enter into the picture.

Not all societies have embraced the leisure culture whether through certain public policies like having a universal welfare system, and psychological and financial preparedness on the part of individuals for retirement wherein leisure is the salient feature.  This even applies to developed nations.  For example, the US has a "retirement crisis" in which a large percentage of Americans do not have sufficient savings for retirement.

Economic productivity being often if not always equated with work, the culture of leisure is seldom recognized as a major contributor to a growing business sector.   For this reason, many societies do not have in place an infrastructure that strongly supports the leisure culture – such as represented by a universal social welfare system, a wealth of products, services and amenities for retirees.  Such societies even if they were to become more affluent may continue to find happiness elusive even for retirees.

Leisure is intrinsically sought after as a way to release the tensions of work-life. It is often used to indulge in activities meant to reduce stress, such as surfing the Internet, watching movies or playing games. Leisure also allows people – without the need of any modern gadgets – to re-connect with family and friends and experience the happiness arising from interactions such as chatting over a drink or meal.

Health
Historically, major Eastern mystical teachings on human development, like those from India and China, do not make a separation between the spiritual and physical. Happiness or contentment was never viewed as an isolated state from physical health.  Physical health-enhancing practices such as Hatha yoga and qigong – and their respective herbalism known as Ayurveda and TCM (traditional Chinese medicine) – were consonant with and fully integrated into those mystical teachings in the implicit belief that the attainment of the ideal state of consciousness requires a healthy body as a launchpad or basis even.

Personal development and health in these systems are understood more as a holistic development of the various aspects of the multidimensional human being.

The concept of body and mind interplay (including relationship factor) now known as psychosomatic medicine has always been present in these "mystical teachings", particularly in TCM.  An unhappy, angry patient may be told by a TCM physician that there is a lot of trapped heat in their internal organs and then treated accordingly with herbs or acupuncture. At times, if the TCM physician is a qigong practitioner, they may even recommend some qigong exercises for the patient to practise.

However given that adepts in such complex holistic analysis and treatment are hard to come by, Eastern health maintenance practices may not necessarily be always adequate, reliable or even safe.  Mainstream Western medicine and a good personal knowledge into the common health issues and how to treat them safely at home should also be included in the total package to ensure good health so that the human body can be fit vehicle for optimal and positive performance – the foundation of happiness.

Outer success and material possession are secondary when health is compromised. One cannot be happy or contented when the body is broken, although there are rare, exceptional individuals who are able to rise above their physical predicament.  However, for the vast majority having a good knowledge and an effective protocol for personal health is critical to happiness not just to oneself but also to one's family and friends.

Laughter
Laughter is synonymous with happiness.  A proposal is made here that when a line of thought (e.g. joke) or sensation (e.g. tickling) is not expected by one's psychological or physiological order respectively, it triggers a certain chaos and temporary breakdown of that order.  The innate Contentment intrinsic to the person then breaks through this temporal breach to express itself in happy laughter.

Laughter has been used as a health therapy for many years such as in some hospitals through the showing of TV comedies for patients.  Laughter clubs have also been formed in India and some Asian countries to promote laughter as a form of health-enhancement through regular meet-ups. Recent findings show that there is truth in the popular saying, "Laughter is the best medicine,".

Universal social welfare
Contentment has also been studied as a cultural or political phenomenon.  The Nordic nations, which have repeatedly appeared near the top in Happiness Index surveys like World Happiness Report – and most likely correlated economic performance as well – contend that higher rates of happiness are rooted in their welfare system, the "Nordic model", which not only fulfills the healthcare, social and other essential needs of their people but also is proposed to provide a high sense of security.

Other research indicates a substantial portion of Scandinavians exaggerate their sense of happiness or contentment when asked informally or in surveys, due to social prohibitions against expressing negativity or unhappiness.
The region's rates of alcohol abuse, among the highest in Europe, have also been cited as an indication that the positive social effects attributed to the Nordic model are exaggerated.

Judaism 
Some of the earliest references to the state of contentment are found in the reference to the midah (personal attribute) of Samayach B'Chelko (in Hebrew שמח בחלקו). The expression comes from the word samayach (root Sin-Mem-Chet in Hebrew - ש.מ.ח) meaning "happiness, joy or contentment", and chelko (root Chet-Lamed-Kuf in Hebrew - ח.ל.ק) meaning "portion, lot, or piece", and combined mean contentment with one's lot in life. The attribute is referred to in the Mishnahic source which says, "Ben Zoma said: Who is rich? Those who are happy with their portion."

The origins of contentment in Jewish culture reflect an even older thinking reflected in the Book of Proverbs which says: "A joyful heart makes a cheerful face; A sad heart makes a despondent mood. All the days of a poor person are wretched, but contentment is a feast without end."

The issue of contentment remained in Jewish thinking during the Middle Ages as evident for example in the writings of Solomon Ibn Gabirol, an eleventh-century Spanish poet-philosopher who taught:

Who seeks more than he needs, hinders himself from enjoying what he has. Seek what you need and give up what you need not. For in giving up what you don't need, you'll learn what you really do need.

Christianity 
During his ministry, Christ himself gives an inventory of these "satisfactions", called beatitudes: "Blessed are the poor in spirit, for the Kingdom of Heaven is theirs", "Blessed are the hungry and thirsty for righteousness, for they will be satisfied ”,“ happy the pure in heart, for they will see God ”. Many other people in the Bible also spoke about contentment:

Jesus Christ defended love as the fundamental element for achieving harmony on all levels, including the level of individual happiness. True gratitude comes from accepting Christ and believing that in Him you will have everything you need.

Be content (Luke 10:7). The 70 disciples were told not to seek better accommodations; they were to stay in the home that first received them.

The vision of Christianity considers that in life it is essential to be happy and satisfied.

Islam

In Islam, true contentment is achieved through establishing a relationship with Allah, always keeping Him in mind.  The Quran states:

This verse reveals that the more the people gain the trivial goods of this life, the greater becomes the hunger and the consequent burning of their hearts. Moreover, there is no end for worldly desires and greed. But as for those who seek God, the more they turn to Him, the greater is their peace of mind.  This means that a search for the divine or a supreme Deity is inherent within human nature and the innermost yearning of a human being.  The real and ultimate goal of a person's life.

In a well known Hadith (saying of the prophet Muhammad) the prophet said:

Eastern religions
In Yoga (Yoga Sutras of Patanjali), movement or positions, breathing practices, and concentration, as well as the yamas and niyamas, can contribute to a physical state of contentment (santosha).

Buddhism
Contentment which known as santutthi in Pāli is the freedom from anxiety, wanting, or craving. It is an important virtue that was mentioned in many important Buddhist scriptures like Metta Sutta, Mangala Sutta etc. In the verse 204 of Dhammapada, contentment is mentioned as the greatest wealth. In the "Discourse on the Traditions of the Noble Ones" from Anguttara Nikāya, Lord Buddha mentioned that the Noble Ones are contented with old robes, old almsfood and old lodging. 
"Having cast away all deeds,
Who could obstruct him? 
Like an ornament of finest gold,
Who is fit to find fault with him?"

Sikhism
Contentment (or Sabar or Santokh) is an important aspect in Sikh life and is known as attainment of First Treasure. Sikhism categorizes Contentment into two forms: Contentment (Santokh) and True Contentment (Satt Santokh/Sabar). Contentment can be broken, turning souls greedy for the temporal world, but True Contentment is never broken and such a soul is eligible for the Supreme State. The soul having contentment is called Saabari or Santokhi.

See also
Comfort
Deferred gratification
Gratification
Pleasure
Happiness

Footnotes

 5 Ways To Feel Content With Your Life Right NowWith Your Life Right Now]==References==
 Borowitz, Eugene B. & Weinman Schwartz, Frances, The Jewish Moral Virtues, Jewish Publication Society, 1999
 Meir Leibush (Malbim), Rabbi, translated by Charles Wengrov and Avivah Gottlieb Zornberg, Malbim on Mishley: The Book of Proverbs in Hebrew & English, Feldheim, 2001
 Fohrman, David & Kasnett, Nesanel, Rabbis, editors, Babylonian Talmud Volume 3, Shabbat 32a, Volume I, ArtScroll / Mesorah, 1999
 

Positive mental attitude
 Happiness
Emotions
Virtue